The 82nd Emperor's Cup Statistics of Emperor's Cup in the 2002 season.

Overview
It was contested by 80 teams, and Kyoto Purple Sanga won the cup.

Results

First round
West Kagawa High School 0–1 Kokushikan University
YSCC 1–7 Otsuka Pharmaceuticals
Kunimi High School 3–0 Yamagata Central High School
Centro de Futebol Edu 3–1 Volca Kagoshima
International Budo University 1–2 Oita Trinita
Teihens FC 0–6 Cerezo Osaka
Iwami FC 2–1 Fukui KSC
Tokuyama University 0–2 Sagawa Express Osaka
Tsukuba University 1–3 Ventforet Kofu
Ohara Gakuen JaSRA 0–1 Avispa Fukuoka
Fukuoka University of Education 1–2 Alouette Kumamoto
Tochigi SC 3–1 Iwate University
Kyushu INAX 0–5 Mito HollyHock
Takada 0–3 Yokohama FC
Sagawa Printing 1–0 TDK
Denso 1–1(PK 3–1) Sapporo University
Gunma Horikoshi 2–1 Montedio Yamagata
Kwansei Gakuin University 2–5 Sagan Tosu
Tokyo Gakugei University 5–1 Hachinohe University
Saitama 2–1 YKK AP SC
Fukushima University 1–5 Omiya Ardija
Nangoku Kochi 1–4 Shonan Bellmare
Sony Sendai 2–3 Japan Soccer College
Ehime FC 6–1 Mitsubishi Nagasaki SC
Muchz FC 0–7 Kawasaki Frontale
Kihoku Shukyudan 0–9 Albirex Niigata
Tottori 2–1 Alex SC
Profesor Miyazaki 4–3 Kibi International University
Okinawa Kariyushi 2–3 Honda FC
Kakamihara High School 0–9 Komazawa University
Oita Trinita U-18 1–1(PK 5–3) Sanfrecce Hiroshima Youth
Nirasaki Astros 0–2 Hamamatsu University

Second round
Kokushikan University 1–2 Kunimi High School
Otsuka Pharmaceuticals 3–0 Centro de Futebol Edu
Oita Trinita 3–0 Iwami FC
Cerezo Osaka 4–1 Sagawa Express Osaka
Ventforet Kofu 2–0 Alouette Kumamoto
Avispa Fukuoka 2–1 Tochigi SC
Mito HollyHock 4–0 Sagawa Printing
Yokohama 3–2 Denso
Gunma Horikoshi 0–1 Tokyo Gakugei University
Sagan Tosu 7–0 Saitama
Omiya Ardija 4–0 Japan Soccer College
Shonan Bellmare 1–0 Ehime
Kawasaki Frontale 6–0 Tottori
Albirex Niigata 1–0 Profesor Miyazaki
Honda 3–0 Oita Trinita U-18
Komazawa University 1–0 Hamamatsu University

Third round
Júbilo Iwata 2–0 Kunimi High School
Nagoya Grampus Eight 2–0 Otsuka Pharmaceuticals
Consadole Sapporo 0–5 Oita Trinita
Kashiwa Reysol 1–2 Cerezo Osaka
Vegalta Sendai 1–0 Ventforet Kofu
Urawa Red Diamonds 1–2 Avispa Fukuoka
JEF United Ichihara 4–0 Mito HollyHock
Kyoto Purple Sanga 4–0 Yokohama
Kashima Antlers 4–0 Tokyo Gakugei University
Shimizu S-Pulse 4–2 Sagan Tosu
Tokyo Verdy 0–2 Omiya Ardija
Tokyo 3–4 Shonan Bellmare
Vissel Kobe 1–3 Kawasaki Frontale
Sanfrecce Hiroshima 2–0 Albirex Niigata
Gamba Osaka 3–1 Honda FC
Yokohama F. Marinos 3–0 Komazawa University

Fourth round
Júbilo Iwata 2–0 Oita Trinita
Nagoya Grampus Eight 5–2 Cerezo Osaka
Vegalta Sendai 1–2 JEF United Ichihara
Avispa Fukuoka 0–1 Kyoto Purple Sanga
Kashima Antlers 1–0 Omiya Ardija
Shimizu S-Pulse 3–2 Shonan Bellmare
Kawasaki Frontale 1–0 Gamba Osaka
Sanfrecce Hiroshima 2–1 Yokohama F. Marinos

Quarter finals
Júbilo Iwata 0–1 JEF United Ichihara
Nagoya Grampus Eight 0–1 Kyoto Purple Sanga
Kashima Antlers 1–0 Kawasaki Frontale
Shimizu S-Pulse 1–3 Sanfrecce Hiroshima

Semi finals
JEF United Ichihara 0–2 Kashima Antlers
Kyoto Purple Sanga 2–1 Sanfrecce Hiroshima

Final

Kashima Antlers 1–2 Kyoto Purple Sanga
Kyoto Purple Sanga won the cup and guaranteed a place in the 2004 AFC Champions League But Sanga were relegated to the Division 2 in 2003 so this spot was transferred to Yokohama F. Marinos, the 2002 J.League Division 1 runner-up.

References
 NHK

Emperor's Cup
Emp
2003 in Japanese football